South Rawdon is a community in the Canadian province of Nova Scotia, located in the Municipality of East HantsIt is a beautiful wooded area where the locals enjoy fishing, hunting, off-roading and other outdoor activities. It is the home of the Herbert River, where people enjoy swimming and tubing.

See Upper Rawdon, Nova Scotia for history of the Township of Rawdon.

References
South Rawdon on Destination Nova Scotia

Communities in Hants County, Nova Scotia
General Service Areas in Nova Scotia